Lesley Maria Hall  (27 November 1954 – 19 October 2013) was a disability advocate, arts administrator, writer and activist. She was one of the founders of the Women with Disabilities Feminist Collective (WDFC), now known as Women with Disabilities Australia (WWDA), and Chief Executive Officer of the Australian Federation of Disability Organisations (AFDO).

In 1981 Hall staged a protest at the Miss Australia Quest, a beauty pageant held as a fundraiser for the organisation then known as the Spastic Society.

Hall was a member of the Melbourne Workers Theatre, and worked as an arts officer for the Darebin City Council.

Hall was known for her disability advocacy, including contributing to the formation of the National Disability Insurance Scheme.

Recognition 
Hall was inducted onto the Victorian Honour Roll of Women in 2014. She received a posthumous Order of Australia medal in 2015. The Lesley Hall Scholarship is an annual award in Hall's honour by Arts Access Victoria.

References 

1954 births
2013 deaths
Australian women activists
Australian disability rights activists
Recipients of the Medal of the Order of Australia